Yasemin Kay Allen (born 11 July 1989) is an English-Turkish actress.

Early years
Yasemin Kay Allen, born 10 July 1989, in London, is the daughter of an English father Dudley Allen and English-Turkish actress and singer Sonja Eady. Eady has been known as Suna Yıldızoğlu following her first marriage in 1974 to the Turkish actor Kayhan Yıldızoğlu, upon which she also gained Turkish citizenship. Her mother's adopted Turkish citizenship means that Yasemin is a dual Turkish-British citizen despite not being ethnically Turkish. She stated that she is of English 50% descent and of Australian 25% descent. 

She has a brother named Kaan. Her family moved to Turkey when she was three months old. She went to Australia with her mother after she completed her elementary school. There she took cinema, television, drama and Japanese courses. She earned scholarship from University of Queensland. She returned to Turkey when she was eighteen. Then graduated from Müjdat Gezen Konservatuarı with degree of Theater Arts.

Career 
Yasemin Allen was a finalist in the L'Oréal' competition. The same year she played the leading role in the Turkish television series Elif. In 2010 she starred as Elena in the series Kavak Yelleri (Turkish version of Dawson's Creek), and Juliette in another TV series Yerden Yüksek.She performed French and Russian accents for this roles. She can do various accents in Turkish and English. She played with her mother for third time in "Elif", "Yerden Yüksek", "46 Yok Olan".

In 2011 she played Pelin Akca in Hayat Devam Ediyor. In 2013 she played Irmak Tunalı in the series Merhamet. At the same year she appeared in the shopping site advertisements of N11.com.In 2013, Yasemin Allen starred alongside Turkish singer Özcan Deniz in her film debut Su ve Ateş, playing the leading role Yagmur Efe She then starred as Defne Sultan in the epic drama series Muhteşem Yüzyıl. In the same year she played the character Sibel in the gang drama series Şeref Meselesi; the character was shot to death in the 21st episode, thus ended her role of the series. As of January 2019, Allen co-stars in season 7 and 8 of the British action drama series Strike Back as Russian agent "Katrina Zarkova".

Filmography

Awards

References

External links 
 
 Yasemin Allen Facebook
 

1989 births
Living people
Actresses from London
Turkish television actresses
Turkish film actresses
English television actresses
English film actresses
Turkish people of English descent
English people of Turkish descent